Tang Jian (579–656), courtesy name Maoyue, posthumously known as Duke Xiang of Ju, was a Chinese official who lived in the early Tang dynasty and rose to prominence during the reign of Emperor Taizong.

Family
Tang Jian's grandfather, Tang Yong (唐邕), was the chancellor of Northern Qi dynasty. His family had a close friendship for generations with the Li family, the imperial family of the Tang dynasty; Tang Jian's father, Tang Jiàn (唐鉴), was a close ally of Emperor Gaozu (Li Yuan), the founder of the Tang dynasty.

Tang Jian was born in Jinyang (晋阳), which is present-day Taiyuan, Shanxi.

Tang Jian had three sons:
 Tang Shanshi (唐善識)
 Tang Heshang (唐河上)
 Tang Guan (唐観)

Service under Emperor Taizong
Tang Jian played an important diplomatic role in erasing the Eastern Tujue's power over East Asia. He was sent by Emperor Taizong to meet the Khan of the Eastern Tujue. His main task was to persuade Jiali Khan to surrender. Around the same time, the Tang army led by Li Jing attacked the Eastern Tujue by surprise, defeated them, and captured Jiali Khan.

References
Historic records:
 Old Book of Tang; Volume 58, The Biography of Tang Jian.
 New Book of Tang; Volume 89, The Biography of Tang Jian.

Cultural relics:
 The Epitaph of Tang Jian (唐故開府儀同三司特進戸部尚書上柱国莒国公唐君墓誌(唐倹墓誌))
 The Epitaph of Tang Heshang (大唐故殿中少監上柱国唐府君墓誌銘(唐河上墓誌))

579 births
656 deaths
Tang dynasty diplomats
Tang dynasty generals at war against Xueyantuo
Transition from Sui to Tang